Trump Plaza is a 36-story cooperative apartment and retail building at 167 East 61st Street on the Upper East Side of Manhattan, New York City. The property, designed by 
Philip Birnbaum and named after Donald Trump, opened in 1984 at a cost of $125 million.

History

Construction
Construction of Trump Plaza began in 1982, at the intersection of East 61st Street and Third Avenue. Donald Trump negotiated a 40-year deal with the owner of the land in which the building would pay an annual rent of approximately $1.2 million until 2023. Trump chose to name the project Trump Plaza to capitalize on the marketing success of his nearby Trump Tower. The project, initially expected to cost $50 million, was to contain 180 cooperative apartment units, located above  of retail space that would be situated on the ground floor.

Two project offices on East 61st Street, made of brownstone, were to be converted into apartments after the main structure was completed. Trump said that despite the popularity of condominiums in New York at that time, "I wanted to buck the trend. There are a lot of people who want to live in a cooperative. […] Many people find a co-op's exclusivity, the unity it gives a building, comforting. This exclusivity can be used negatively, but it has positive aspects as well."

Sales began in April 1983, with initial prices starting at $450 per square foot. In May 1983, a construction worker died after falling 33 stories while working on the project. By July 1983, starting prices for apartment units in the project had increased six times, ultimately reaching up to $1,200 per square foot; 50 percent of the apartments had been leased up to that point. The building cost $125 million to construct.

The concrete and concrete workers union labor for the building was supplied by mobster Anthony "Fat Tony" Salerno . Salerno and Trump were linked through Roy Cohn, who represented both of them. In 1986 Rudy Giuliani and the SDNY indicted Salerno on racketeering linked to the bid rigging of concrete and construction on Trump Plaza, as well as other buildings built in the era.

Opening and operation
Trump Plaza was opened in March 1984, with 145 units. Notable residents included former Kentucky governor John Y. Brown Jr. and his wife Phyllis George, as well as Dick Clark and Martina Navratilova. At the time of opening, Trump owned 90 percent of the building partnership. Apartment owners, under the name of Trump Plaza Owners Inc., sued Trump in February 1990, claiming the building contained various defects. The suit sought for Trump to pay $10.7 million and to have his name removed from the building.

As of 1999, Trump still owned a few apartment units, as well as retail space and the property's parking garage. As of 2015, the property is operated by Douglas Elliman Property Management. In 2016, to remain competitive with newer residential projects, Trump Plaza's basement gym facility was converted into a children's playroom, while the gym was relocated to a space on the first and second floor that was previously used as an apartment by the building superintendent.

Design
Trump Plaza was designed by Philip Birnbaum and was built out in a Y-shape. Trump, who sometimes exaggerated the number of floors in his buildings, stated that Trump Plaza was 39 stories high while it is actually 36 stories.

Although Birnbaum was known for simple building designs in New York City, architectural critic Paul Goldberger stated that Trump Plaza "looks as if it might be the finest building in Caracas – all of this sleekness is chic in a particularly Latin way, quite uncharacteristic of New York, despite the lavish use of limestone." Goldberger also stated that no one "could possibly mistake it for yet another Third Avenue high-rise." Goldberger later called it "a better and more striking building than the typical Third Avenue brick box, but it is nothing if not showy."

Birnbaum was subsequently hired to design a nearby high-rise condominium known as the Savoy, to be built at the opposite intersection corner diagonally across from Trump Plaza. Birnbaum gave the Savoy a similar design to Trump Plaza, as he envisioned the buildings as the gateway to upper Third Avenue. In April 1984, Trump sued Birnbaum and Morton Olshan, owner of the Savoy, for allegedly copying the design of his building. Trump sought $60 million in damages. A settlement was reached in October 1984, after Olshan agreed to have his building redesigned. The Savoy was still under construction at the time.

In 2016, Steve Cuozzo of the New York Post stated that the area around Trump Plaza had been "a lost highway of tenements and boxy, bland apartment buildings" and that the project "inspired four more similarly configured towers on the avenue and lent some badly needed class to uptown east of Lexington Avenue."

Retail
An Italian restaurant named Alo Alo, owned by film producer Dino De Laurentiis and Brazilian business partner Ricardo Amaral, opened inside the building in 1985. By 1989, the restaurant had been sold. In 2004, Select Comfort signed a 10-year lease to operate a  furniture store inside the building, replacing a restaurant known as Commissary. In 2007, western retailer Billy Martin's USA opened a new  store inside Trump Plaza. In 2012, the  Lobel's Kitchen opened inside the building. By April 2014, the Lobel's Kitchen space was for lease at a cost of $600,000 per year. Within two months, American Apparel planned to open a store in the former Lobel's space.

References

Donald Trump
Residential skyscrapers in Manhattan
Residential buildings completed in 1984
Condominiums and housing cooperatives in Manhattan